Trevose Head Lighthouse is a lighthouse on Trevose Head on the north Cornish coast at  lying to the WSW of Padstow  and was sited here as there was previously no light from Land's End to Lundy and it would be visible from Cape Cornwall to Hartland Point.

History

Construction
The site was surveyed by order of the Trinity Board in July 1844 with a design submitted that November and approved February 1845.  Building began in that May with the laying out of the road and contract entered into with the builders the next month.  During gales on 20–21 November 1846 scaffolding attached to the tower was blown away.

After completion of the first tower, it was determined that the light was under certain circumstances liable to be mistaken by mariners. A second lower light was therefore proposed and (the decision having been taken in June 1847) it was constructed, 50 feet in front of the first light, with a covered passage between them for use by the lighthouse keepers.  Only the first built 'high' light now remains.

Designed by engineer James Walker the two original lights, 'high' and 'low', were constructed under the supervision of Henry Norris by builders Jacob & Thomas Olver of Falmouth. They were provided with a pair of first-order fixed optics by Henry Lépaute of Paris and each had an oil lamp with 4 concentric wicks manufactured by Messrs. Wilkins & Co. of Long Acre.

The light was first lit on 1 December 1847.

Later developments
In 1882, under Engineer-in-Chief James Douglass, the 'high' light was changed to an occulting light, now with a six-wick lamp, and the 'low' light was put out of use. Under the new arrangement the high light was eclipsed (for three seconds) three times in quick succession every minute.

From 1911 a series of further improvements were made. First, the keepers' dwellings were upgraded. Then, in 1912 the light was again updated and the current rotating optic (weighing 3.6 tons) was installed. At the same time, the addition of a red filter to the lamp meant that (as from 1 August 1912) the lighthouse displayed one short red flash every five seconds.

Work also began on installing a fog signal: a 5-inch siren attached to a 36-foot-long acoustic horn, which came into service in 1913; it was nicknamed 'Lord Rayleigh's trumpet' after its designer, the eminent physicist and acoustician. The trumpet and siren were built on to the roof of a new engine house, containing a pair of Hornsby oil engines, the air compressor, reservoirs and other equipment.

In 1920 a paraffin vapour burner replaced the oil lamp; it continued to show one red flash every 5 seconds.

The fog signal equipment all remained in service until 1963, when the trumpet and siren were replaced by a set of eight 'supertyfon' air horns mounted in a metal turret on top of the engine house. New diesel engines and Reavell compressors were provided. The light was electrified in 1974.

In 1995 the lighthouse was automated and became unmanned. The red colour was removed from the light at this time and the rotation speed of the optic was slowed. By this stage the engine house was suffering cracking due to erosion; with automation a new fog signal was installed (a stack of electric emitters placed at the foot of the lighthouse) whereupon the old engine house was demolished.

The fog signal was decommissioned in 2012. The former keepers' cottages (arranged in two semi-detached pairs) are nowadays available to rent as holiday accommodation.

See also

 List of lighthouses in England

References

External links

 Trevose Head at Trinity House (official website).
 Video tour of the lighthouse by former keeper P. Halil (1993 & 1995).

Lighthouses completed in 1847
Lighthouses in Cornwall
1847 establishments in England
Grade II listed lighthouses
Grade II listed buildings in Cornwall